Oglethorpe is a city in Macon County, Georgia, United States. The population was 995 at the 2020 census, down from 1,328 in 2010. The city is the county seat of Macon County. It was named for Georgia's founder, James Oglethorpe.

History
Oglethorpe was founded in 1838. It was located in the Black Belt of Georgia, where slaves outnumbered whites and did the work to support cultivation of cotton as a commodity crop. Oglethorpe was incorporated as a town in 1849 and as a city in 1852. In 1857, the seat of Macon County was transferred to Oglethorpe from Lanier.

Oglethorpe was once one of the largest cities in southwestern Georgia. Epidemics of malaria and smallpox caused high fatalities in the early 1860s; the remaining residents in Oglethorpe fled south to Americus to escape more disease.

Geography
Oglethorpe is located in south-central Macon County at  (32.293328, -84.062616). It sits on high ground west of the Flint River, which forms the boundary between Oglethorpe and the larger city of Montezuma. 

Georgia State Route 49 passes through the center of town as Chatham Street. It leads east into Montezuma and northeast  to Marshallville, while to the southwest it leads  to Americus. State Route 90 enters from the north on North Randolph Street and Sumter Street and leaves to the east on Chatham Street. It connects Oglethorpe with Rupert  to the northwest and with Vienna  to the southeast. State Route 128 leaves Oglethorpe to the north with SR 90 but leads  to Reynolds. State Route 26 (Riverview Drive) passes through the south side of Oglethorpe, leading east through Montezuma  to Hawkinsville and west  to Ellaville.

Demographics

2020 census

As of the 2020 United States census, there were 995 people, 561 households, and 351 families residing in the city.

2000 census
As of the census of 2000, there were 1,200 people, 481 households, and 320 families residing in the city. The racial makeup of the city was 27.67% White, 70.25% African American, 0.25% Native American, 0.75% Asian, 0.75% from other races, and 0.33% from two or more races. Hispanic or Latino of any race were 0.83% of the population.

There were 481 households, out of which 30.4% had children under the age of 18 living with them, 31.0% were married couples living together, 29.3% had a female householder with no husband present, and 33.3% were non-families. 30.8% of all households were made up of individuals, and 13.5% had someone living alone who was 65 years of age or older. The average household size was 2.44 and the average family size was 3.01.

In the city, the population was spread out, with 26.8% under the age of 18, 9.6% from 18 to 24, 27.8% from 25 to 44, 21.5% from 45 to 64, and 14.4% who were 65 years of age or older. The median age was 36 years. For every 100 females, there were 87.5 males. For every 100 females age 18 and over, there were 81.2 males.

The median income for a household in the city was $22,875, and the median income for a family was $28,971. Males had a median income of $27,250 versus $18,571 for females. The per capita income for the city was $13,673. About 19.1% of families and 23.2% of the population were below the poverty line, including 29.5% of those under age 18 and 20.3% of those age 65 or over.

Education

Macon County School District 
The Macon County School District holds pre-school to grade twelve, and consists of one elementary school, a middle school, and a high school. The district has 129 full-time teachers and over 2,200 students.
Macon County Elementary School
Macon County Middle School
Macon County High School

References

External links

Cities in Georgia (U.S. state)
Cities in Macon County, Georgia
County seats in Georgia (U.S. state)